The 13th Pan American Games were held in Winnipeg, Manitoba, Canada from July 23 to August 8, 1999.

Medals

Gold

Three-day Event: Mary Jane Tumbridge

Silver

Results by events

Athletics
Brian Wellman
Terrance Armstrong
DeVon Bean

Bowling
Antoine Jones
Steven Riley
June Dill
Dianne Ingham
Patricia Price
Darnell Raynor
Dean Lightbourn
Conrad Lister

Cycling
Elliot Hubbard

Gymnastics
Walid Mustafa
Josee Roy
Laura Murphy
Sasha Christensen
Christina White
Alexandra Froncioni
Leila Wadson

Equestrian
Mary Jane Tumbridge
Kevin Edwards
Catherine Fox
Christopher Taylor

Sailing
Malcolm Smith
Sara Wright
Brett Wright
Christian Luthi

Swimming
Stephen Troake
Ronald Cowen
Matthew Hammond

See also
 Bermuda at the 2000 Summer Olympics

References
Bermuda Olympic Committee

Nations at the 1999 Pan American Games
P
1999